In Justice is an American police procedural television series created by Michelle King and Robert King. The series began airing on Sunday, January 1, 2006, on ABC as a midseason replacement and assumed its regular night and time on Friday, January 6, 2006, at 9 p.m. EST. It ended after its 13-episode run on March 31, 2006. The series was simulcast in Canada on CTV. In the UK In Justice was shown on UKTV Gold beginning September 17, 2006 and was later repeated on ABC1 in 2007.

On May 16, 2006, ABC cancelled the series. Series creators Michelle and Robert King went on to develop the series The Good Wife.

Premise 
In Justice focuses on freeing wrongly convicted criminals. Kyle MacLachlan (of Twin Peaks) stars as David Swain, a wealthy and successful lawyer who heads a high-profile organization called the National Justice Project (commonly abbreviated as "NJP") in the San Francisco Bay Area, along with his lead investigator, ex–police detective Charles Conti (portrayed by Jason O'Mara). Members of the National Justice Project work pro-bono to overturn wrongful convictions, liberate the falsely accused and discover the identity of those who are really to blame. Although the NJP is fictional, there are organizations which examine cases involving people who may have been wrongly convicted (e.g. the Innocence Project).

Each new episode starts out with "what the jury believed", usually a scene in which the person who was wrongly convicted acts out the crime. Throughout the show, David and Charles unravel many clues to how and why the person they are trying to exonerate was convicted in the first place.

Each episode revolves around separate cases and addresses the various reasons for miscarriage of justice. The progress in the show relies less on the famous but largely fictitious forensic procedures used in the CSI franchise and other procedural shows. In a few episodes "CSI-fiction" is mentioned as a description of theatre and inaccuracy, and sometimes forgery of forensics technology.

The series deals with a few subplots. The most prominent is Conti's remorse from his time as a police officer, when he caused an innocent suspect's suicide by coercing him to confess to the murder of his family, and how it makes him obsessed with clearing the wrongfully convicted. 
Other subplots deals with Swain's uneasy relationship with judicial colleagues and the district attorney's attempts to discredit him, Sonya's personal motivations for clearing the wrongfully convicted—her brother being one of them, and Brianna's reservations and doubts about some of the cases.

Cast 
 Jason O'Mara as Charles Conti
 Kyle MacLachlan as David Swain
 Marisol Nichols as Sonya Quintano
 Constance Zimmer as Brianna
 Daniel Cosgrove as Jon Lemonick
 Tim Guinee as Richard Rocca
 McKinley Freeman as Ray Estevez

Episodes 
The show's "sneak-peek" episode aired on January 1, 2006, while the original series pilot was aired on January 6, 2006. According to Variety, the program won its timeslot in the January 1 sneak airing and finished second in its January 6 timeslot, the latter just slightly behind CBS's Close to Home. The eighth episode, "The Public Burning", came in second to NBC's coverage of the Winter Olympics.

The team succeeds in clearing a convicted person in each episode, except in "The Public Burning", where justice fails and a mildly mentally challenged man is executed just minutes before truth is revealed (though it is unclear if the team were able to expose the killer, since Conti confronts the murderer in his house).

Reception
On Rotten Tomatoes the series has an approval rating of 40% based on reviews from 10 critics. The site's consensus states: "In Justice brandishes a refreshingly righteous premise, but this derivative procedural's good intentions can't vindicate the indistinctive casting and uninspired cases". On Metacritic the series has a score of 48% based on reviews from 16 critics, indicating "mixed or average reviews".

David Hinckley of the New York Daily News compared the show to Without a Trace and Cold Case. He wrote: "The chemistry among the leads isn't fully there, and the trail of clues, at least in the opening two episodes, relies on a lot of serendipity and improbable deductive work. But In Justice is a watchable show."

Phil Gallo of Variety called the show "A model of midseason mediocrity". Tom Shales of The Washington Post wrote: "It's an imitation of something already being imitated here, there and everywhere." Tim Goodman of the San Francisco Chronicle called the show "a mess" and was critical of ABC for not knowing what they wanted the show to be.

See also
 Innocence Project
 List of wrongful convictions in the United States

References

External links 
 
 In Justice and Jason O'Mara

2000s American crime drama television series
2000s American police procedural television series
2006 American television series debuts
2006 American television series endings
American Broadcasting Company original programming
English-language television shows
2000s American legal television series
Television series by ABC Studios
Television series created by Robert and Michelle King
Wrongful conviction advocacy